The 2011–12 Central Coast Mariners season will be Central Coast Mariners's seventh A-League season. It includes the 2011–12 A-League season as well as any other competitions of the 2011–12 football (soccer) season. This will include competing in the 2012 AFC Champions League.

Pre-season and friendlies
The 2011 off-season is longer than usual (March–October) as Football Federation Australia shifted the next season's start back to avoid clashing with the NRL and AFL finals.

In May, it was announced that the Mariners would play Celtic on their tour of Australia in July, a game which the Mariners won 1–0 through a late Troy Hearfield long range effort.

The Mariners also agreed to a deal with a new kit supplier, Hummel International.

Much of the news at the club in pre-season related to the future of young talent Mustafa Amini, who had attracted interest from many European clubs, including German champions Borussia Dortmund and Scottish side Celtic, amongst others. After an extended negotiation period, Amini was sold to Dortmund, and immediately loaned back to the Mariners until May 2012.

Pre-season fixtures included the annual tour of the Australian Capital Territory, and a tour of New Zealand. Whilst in Canberra, the Mariners retained the Bank of Queensland Cup, winning their annual clash with Belconnen United FC 5–0. Overall, the Mariners enjoyed a successful pre-season, including wins over A-League opposition Perth Glory and Wellington Phoenix. They also won the annual Doug Turnbull cup, against Bankstown City Lions. The Mariners were a game away from a second consecutive undefeated pre-season (after not losing a pre-season game in the 2010 pre-season), however, they were beaten 3–1 by Auckland City FC in Auckland in their final friendly before the season proper. Michael Baird was the top-scorer in pre-season, scoring 7 goals.

Pre-Season triallists
  Adam McGeorge
  Antony Golec
  Austen Ezzell
  Brent Griffiths

Pre-Season fixtures/ friendlies
Games in New South Wales unless specified. Games in this section are in local time.

2011–12 A-League
Fixtures for the 2011–12 A-League were announced in late May. Notable fixtures include a 2011 A-League Grand Final rematch in the opening fixture against Brisbane Roar, and the Mariners' traditional New Year's Eve match, this year against Gold Coast United.

October
The Mariners' season got off to a rough start, with no wins in their first three games, picking up only one point. This included a draw with Gold Coast United, thanks to a late Patrick Zwaanswijk equaliser, and a loss in The F3 Derby against Newcastle. However, they managed to kick start their season with a come from behind win over Perth Glory at Bluetongue Stadium, winning 2–1 with goals from Matt Simon and Bernie Ibini-Isei.

November
November was a successful period for the club, with the Mariners undefeated in their four games in the month. This included an eventful 3–2 win over Sydney FC in the New South Wales derby. Bernie Ibini-Isei was named the A-League's young player of the month for November.

December
The Mariners completed a second consecutive undefeated month in December, with four wins and one draw. This included wins in The F3 Derby as well as a win over rivals Brisbane Roar, and a 4–0 victory over Adelaide United in Adelaide- the side's biggest ever home loss. The annual New Year's Eve match was a nil all draw with Gold Coast United. Late in the month, it was announced that local long-serving striker Matt Simon would be leaving in early January to play for K-League side Chunnam Dragons. The Mariners ended 2011 on top of the A-League ladder. Mustafa Amini was named A-League young player of the month for December.

January
In January, the Mariners were again undefeated, extending their undefeated streak to a club record 15 games by the end of the month. Matt Simon left the club to go to South Korea, scoring a brace in his final game before moving overseas against Melbourne Victory. Trent Sainsbury, Joshua Rose and Bernie Ibini-Isei were re-signed, and Tom Rogic transferred to the team. Mitchell Duke, Jimmy Oates and Anthony Caceres were promoted from the youth team under the terms of their "senior" contracts for the 2012 AFC Champions League and future A-League seasons. The Mariners ended 10 January points clear at the top of the A-League table. On 31 January the Central Coast Mariners confirmed that they had secured the services of John Sutton for 4 months on a loan deal to cover the loss of Matt Simon. Mathew Ryan was named the A-League's young player of the month for January.

February
February saw the end of the Mariners' extended undefeated run, and two other losses in the month saw the lead at the top of the table reduced ahead of Brisbane Roar. Rostyn Griffiths was sold to Guangzhou R&F for what was rumoured to be a club record transfer fee, around the A$1 million mark. By the end of the month, the Central Coast Mariners youth team had all but won the 2011–12 A-League National Youth League title. Tom Rogic won the A-League young player of the month award for February- the fourth consecutive month in which the Mariners had won the award.

March
March was a mixed month for the club, with two wins, one draw and two losses in A-League matches. Wins in the last two games of the regular season earned the Mariners the 2011–12 A-League Premiership, ahead of Brisbane Roar. This earned the team a spot in the 2013 AFC Champions League. The Mariners campaign in the 2012 AFC Champions League began in March, with two draws.

April
On the field, April was a less successful month for the Mariners, with the team eliminated from the 2011–12 A-League finals by Perth Glory and suffering a loss to Seongnam Ilhwa in Seongnam after the two teams drew in Gosford in the 2012 AFC Champions League. Off the field, Mathew Ryan was awarded the A-League's young player and goalkeeper of the year awards, and Graham Arnold was awarded A-League coach of the year. Ryan, Patrick Zwaanswijk and Joshua Rose were named in the team of the season, with Arnold named as coach.

May
May saw the season finish with the end of the 2012 AFC Champions League group stage. A 5–1 win over Tianjin Teda FC- the club's first in the AFC Champions League- saw the Mariners travel to Japan needing to beat Nagoya Grampus to progress in the competition. However, a loss in this game saw the Mariners finish third in the group.

2011–12 squad
Players who have been announced as contracted to the Central Coast Mariners senior squad for the 2011–12 season.

Transfers

In

Out

Loan deals

In

Out

Injuries

2011–12 A-League fixtures/results
All times AEST/AEDST, and PM

Regular season

 *Match rescheduled from 27 January 2012 due to flooding risk in and around Skilled Park.

Finals

2012 AFC Champions League
The Mariners qualified for the 2012 AFC Champions League as runners up in the 2010–11 A-League. In December 2011, they were drawn in group G, along with Nagoya Grampus of Japan, Tianjin Teda FC of China and Seongnam Ilhwa Chunma of South Korea.

Squad stats

Top scorers

References

External links
 Official website

Central Coast Mariners FC seasons
Central Coast